Alexa Tarantino (born May 30, 1992, in West Hartford, Connecticut) is an American jazz saxophonist, woodwind doubler, composer and educator.

Early life and education
Tarantino obtained a bachelor's degree in Jazz Saxophone Performance and Music Education along with a Certificate in Arts Leadership from the Eastman School of Music in Rochester, New York. She received her master's degree in Jazz Studies from The Juilliard School.

Musical career
She has played with Sherrie Maricle and the DIVA Jazz Orchestra, the Jazz at Lincoln Center Orchestra, Darcy James Argue's Secret Society, Wynton Marsalis, Arturo O’Farrill and the Afro Latin Jazz Orchestra, and Cécile McLorin Salvant.

Tarantino's most recent album, Firefly, was released on Posi-Tone Records in 2021 and reached No. 7 on the Jazz Week Charts. Her second album as leader, Clarity, was also released by Posi-Tone. On it, she plays alto and soprano saxophones, flute, and alto flute. Tarantino's debut album as leader, Winds of Change, was released by Posi-Tone Records in 2019, and reached No. 15 on the JazzWeek charts and No. 79 on the 2019 JazzWeek Top 100. The personnel on this album included Ulysses Owens Jr. (drums), Christian Sands (piano), Joe Martin (bass), and Nick Finzer (trombone).

Tarantino was nominated as a "Rising Star- Alto Saxophone" by Downbeat Magazine's Critics' Poll in 2021 and 2020 and JazzTimes Critics' Poll named her one of the "Top 5 Alto Saxophonists of 2019". She has also worked extensively with pianist Steven Feifke. In 2021, Tarantino was a recipient of the Jazz Coalition Fund.

Endorsements 
Tarantino is endorsed by Vandoren, BAM Cases, and Yamaha.

Discography

As leader/co-leader

As sidewoman

References 

Eastman School of Music alumni
Women jazz saxophonists
Posi-Tone Records artists
21st-century saxophonists
1992 births
Living people
Jazz musicians from Connecticut
People from West Hartford, Connecticut